Shawna is a feminine given name. It is a variant of Shauna, derived from Shawn or Sean, an Irish Gaelic name. Its origin is English and means "God is Gracious".

The first name has been present throughout the last century although fluctuating in use. It ranked 882nd in popularity for females of all ages in a 2000-2003 Social Security Administration statistic and 490th in a 1990 US Sample.

Shawna may refer to:

Shawna Robinson (born 1964), American stock car driver and interior designer
Shawna Trpcic (born 1966), American costume designer
Shawna Welsh (born 1989), Canadian actress

See also
Shawnna (born 1978), American rapper.

References

English feminine given names
Feminine given names